Filip Dvořák (born December 2, 1976) is a Czech former professional ice hockey player who played 26 games in the Czech Extraliga over two seasons.

Dvořák made his Czech Extraliga debut playing with HC Olomouc during the 1995-96 Czech Extraliga season.

External links

1976 births
Living people
HC Olomouc players
Czech ice hockey forwards